Subira is a 2007 Kenyan film.

Synopsis 
Subira, 11, is a cheeky young girl raised in an orthodox Muslim community on the remote island of Lamu, Kenya. She dreams of being as free as her brother, but her mother wants her to follow tradition and learn to be an exemplary woman.  Subira, however, has other plans. She wants to live by her own rules no matter what people say.

Awards 
 Kenya IFF 2007
 Amakula IFF 2008
 Cannes 2008
 Zanzibar IFF 2008
 Lola Kenya Children's Screen 2008
 Amiens IFF 2008

References 

 

2007 films
Films set in Kenya
Kenyan drama films
Kenyan short films